Gaoqiang Township is a township under the administration of Yangyuan County in Hebei province, China. , it administers the following 27 villages:
Gaoqiang Village
Nankou Village
Jiugou Village
Duanjiazhuang Village
Yaojiazhuang Village
Beidazhuang Village
Qinggeta Village
Nandazhuangke Village
Fanjiafang Village
Taishiliang Village
Niujiafang Village
Majiazhuang Village
Shamaotai Village
Jinjiazhuang Village
Yiduquan Village
Jiunüchi Village
Xiguanzhuang Village
Dongguanzhuang Village
Daheigou Village
Shangshagou Village
Wangjiashan Village
Zhaojiaping Village
Liujiazui Village
Heiyan Village
Sanguanmiao Village
Guduanzhuang Village
Taijiazhuang Village

References 

Township-level divisions of Hebei
Yangyuan County